The Rocky Mount Telegram is an American, English language daily newspaper based in Rocky Mount, North Carolina.

History
Adams Publishing Group, a family-owned company led by CEO, Mark Adams, bought the Telegram in 2018 from Cooke Communications LLC. The assets included in the purchase included Cooke Communications's print publications, websites and commercial printing operations, located in North Carolina and Florida. Other North Carolina papers included in the sale were The Daily Reflector and Elizabeth City Daily Advance.

See also
 List of newspapers in North Carolina

References

External links
 

Daily newspapers published in North Carolina
Rocky Mount, North Carolina